Symmetric product may refer to:

 The product operation of a symmetric algebra
 The symmetric product of tensors
 The symmetric product of an algebraic curve
 The Symmetric product (topology),  or infinite symmetric product  of a space X in algebraic topology